Carson City is an independent city and the capital of the U.S. state of Nevada. As of the 2020 census, the population was 58,639, making it the sixth largest city in Nevada. The city is named after the mountain man Kit Carson. The town began as a stopover for California-bound immigrants, but developed into a city with the Comstock Lode, a silver strike in the mountains to the northeast. The city has served as Nevada's capital since statehood in 1864; for much of its history it was a hub for the Virginia and Truckee Railroad, although the tracks were removed in 1950.

Before 1969, Carson City was the county seat of Ormsby County. That year the state legislature abolished the county and included its territory into a revised city charter for a Consolidated Municipality of Carson City. With the consolidation, the city limits extend west across the Sierra Nevada to the California state line in the middle of Lake Tahoe. Like other independent cities in the United States, it is treated as a county-equivalent for census purposes.

History

The Washoe people have inhabited the valley and surrounding areas for about 6,000 years.

The first European Americans to arrive in what is now known as Eagle Valley were John C. Frémont and his exploration party in January 1843. Fremont named the river flowing through the valley Carson River in honor of Kit Carson, the mountain man and scout he had hired for his expedition. Later, settlers named the area Washoe, in reference to the indigenous people.

By 1851, the Eagle Station ranch along the Carson River was a trading post and stopover for travelers on the California Trail's Carson Branch, which ran through Eagle Valley. The valley and trading post received their name from a bald eagle that was hunted and killed by one of the early settlers and was featured on a wall inside the post.

As the area was part of the Utah Territory, it was governed from Salt Lake City, where the territorial government was headquartered. Early settlers bristled at the control by Mormon-influenced officials and desired the creation of the Nevada territory. A vigilante group of influential settlers, headed by Abraham Curry, sought a site for a capital city for the envisioned territory. In 1858, Abraham Curry bought Eagle Station and the settlement was thereafter renamed Carson City. Curry and several other partners had Eagle Valley surveyed for development. Curry decided Carson City would someday serve as the capital city and left a  plot in the center of town for a capitol building.

After gold and silver were discovered in 1859 on nearby Comstock Lode, Carson City's population began to grow. Curry built the Warm Springs Hotel a mile to the east of the city center. When territorial governor James W. Nye traveled to Nevada, he chose Carson City as the territorial capital, influenced by Carson City lawyer William Stewart, who escorted him from San Francisco to Nevada. As such, Carson City bested Virginia City and American Flat. Curry loaned the Warm Springs Hotel to the territorial Legislature as a meeting hall. The Legislature named Carson City to be the seat of Ormsby County and selected the hotel as the territorial prison, with Curry serving as its first warden. Today, the property is still part of the state prison.

When Nevada became a state in 1864 during the American Civil War, Carson City was confirmed as Nevada's permanent capital. Carson City's development was no longer dependent on the mining industry and instead became a thriving commercial center. The Virginia and Truckee Railroad was built between Virginia City and Carson City. A log flume was also built from the Sierra Nevada into Carson City. The current capitol building was constructed from 1870 to 1871. The United States Mint operated the Carson City Mint between the years 1870 and 1893, which struck gold and silver coins. People came from China during that time, many to work on the railroad. Some of them owned businesses and taught school. By 1880, almost a thousand Chinese people, "one for every five Caucasians", lived in Carson City.

Carson City's population and transportation traffic decreased when the Central Pacific Railroad built a line through Donner Pass, too far to the north to benefit Carson City. The city was slightly revitalized with the mining booms in Tonopah and Goldfield. The US federal building (now renamed the Paul Laxalt Building) was completed in 1890 as was the Stewart Indian School. Even these developments could not prevent the city's population from dropping to just over 1,500 people by 1930. Carson City resigned itself to small city status, advertising itself as "America's smallest capital". The city slowly grew after World War II; by 1960, it had reached its 1880 boom-time population.

20th-century revitalization and growth
As early as the late 1940s, discussions began about merging Ormsby County and Carson City. By this time, the county was little more than Carson City and a few hamlets to the west. However, the effort did not pay off until 1966, when a statewide referendum approved the merger. The required constitutional amendment was passed in 1968. On April 1, 1969, Ormsby County and Carson City officially merged as the Consolidated Municipality of Carson City. With this consolidation, Carson City absorbed former town sites such as Empire City, which had grown up in the 1860s as a milling center along the Carson River and current U.S. Route 50. Carson City could now advertise itself as one of America's largest state capitals with its  of city limits.

In 1991, the city adopted a downtown master plan, specifying no building within  of the capitol would surpass it in height. This plan effectively prohibited future high-rise development in the center of downtown. The structure was completed in 1972.

Geography
Most of the city proper resides in the Eagle Valley. The Carson River flows from Douglas County through the southwestern edge of both the valley and Carson City. Since the consolidation, the city limits today include several small populated areas outside of this valley. Today the city limits include several peaks in the Sierra Nevada, small portions of both the Virginia Range and the Pine Nut Mountains and portions of Marlette Lake and Lake Tahoe. Carson City is one of two state capitals that border another state, the other being Trenton, New Jersey.

Climate
Carson City features a cold semi-arid climate (Koppen: BSk) with cold winters and hot summers. There are four fairly distinct seasons. Most precipitation occurs in winter and spring, with summer and fall being fairly dry, drier than neighboring California. There are 39.5 days of + highs annually, with + temperatures occurring 1.2 days per year.

Places of interest

Museums
 Nevada State Capitol – original capitol still housing the governor's offices with museum exhibits
 Nevada State Museum – former branch of the United States Mint featuring rock, mining and prehistoric exhibits, and a recreated Wild West village
 Nevada State Railroad Museum – featuring the Inyo locomotive and relocated Wabuska Railroad Station
 Stewart Indian School – museum collection includes items from former faculty, students and school
 Foreman-Roberts House Museum – Gothic Revival architecture, tours available.
 Sears–Ferris House (not open to public) – home of George Washington Gale Ferris Jr., inventor of the Ferris wheel

 Yesterday's Flyers, an aviation museum in Carson City.
 Children's Museum of Northern Nevada – Carson City

Open land
 Silver Saddle Ranch
 Mexican Dam – 1860s stone dam across the Carson River
 Prison Hill – California Trail historic markers, location of the Stewart "S"
 Carson Aquatic Trail
 Humboldt-Toiyabe National Forest (Carson Ranger District)
 Kings Canyon Falls
 Snow Valley Peak –  – highest point within Carson City
 Tahoe Rim Trail
 Lake Tahoe–Nevada State Park
 Lake Tahoe beachfront (several beaches along Lake Tahoe lie within the city limits)
 Chimney Beach
 Secret Harbor
 Whale Beach
 Skunk Harbor
 Washoe Lake State Park – borders city to the north
 "C Hill" – hill featuring the Carson City "C" and giant American Flag

Demographics

Carson City is the smallest of the United States' 366 metropolitan statistical areas.

As of the 2010 census, there were 55,274 people, 20,171 households, and 13,252 families residing in the city. The racial makeup of the city was 81.1% White, 1.9% Black or African American, 2.4% Native American, 2.1% Asian, 0.2% Pacific Islander, 9.4% from other races, and 2.9% from two or more races. 21% of the population were Hispanic or Latino of any race.

As of the 2000 census, there were 20,171 households, out of which 29.8% had children under the age of 18 living with them, 50.0% were married couples living together, 11.0% had a female householder with no husband present, and 34.3% were non-families. 27.8% of all households were made up of individuals, and 11.00% had someone living alone who was 65 years of age or older. The average household size was 2.44 and the average family size was 2.97. The city's age distribution was: 23.4% under the age of 18, 7.9% from 18 to 24, 28.9% from 25 to 44, 24.9% from 45 to 64, and 14.9% who were 65 years of age or older. The median age was 39 years. For every 100 females, there were 106.9 males. For every 100 females age 18 and over, there were 108.2 males.

Data from the 2000 census indicates the median income for a household in the city was $41,809, and the median income for a family was $49,570. Males had a median income of $35,296 versus $27,418 for females. The per capita income for the city was $20,943. 10.0% of the population and 6.9% of families were below the poverty line. Out of the total population, 13.7% of those under the age of 18 and 5.8% of those 65 and older were living below the poverty line.

Languages
As of 2010, 82.3% (42,697) of Carson City residents age 5 and older spoke English at home as a first language, while 14.1% (7,325) spoke Spanish, 0.6% (318) French, and numerous Indo-Aryan languages were spoken as a main language by 0.5% (261) of the population over the age of five. In total, 17.7% (9,174) of Carson City's population age 5 and older spoke a first language other than English.

Government and politics
Ormsby County consolidated with Carson City in 1969, and the county simultaneously dissolved. The city is now governed by a five-member board of supervisors, consisting of a mayor and four supervisors. All members are elected at-large, but each of the four supervisors must reside in respective wards, numbered 1 through 4. The mayor and supervisors serve four year terms. Elections are staggered so the mayor and the supervisors from Wards 2 and Ward 4 are elected in presidential election years, and the supervisors from Wards 1 and 3 are elected in the even-numbered years in between (i.e., the same year as gubernatorial elections).

The city is generally considered a Republican stronghold, often voting for Republicans by wide margins. In 2004, George W. Bush defeated John Kerry 57–40%. In 2008, however, Barack Obama became the first Democrat since 1964 to win Ormsby County/Carson City, defeating John McCain 49–48%, by 204 votes, a margin of under 1%.

Carson City, being the state capital, is home to many political protests and demonstrations at any given time.

In an attempt to either make a proposed spent nuclear fuel storage facility at Yucca Mountain prohibitively expensive (by raising property tax rates to the maximum allowed) or to allow the state to collect the potential federal payments of property taxes on the facility, the state government in 1987 carved Yucca Mountain out of Nye County and created a new county with no residents out of the area surrounding Yucca called Bullfrog County. A state judge found the process unconstitutional in 1989, and Bullfrog County's territory was retroceded to Nye County.

Culture

Sports and recreation
Carson City has never hosted any professional team sports. However, a variety of sports are offered at parks and recreation. Many neighborhood parks offer a wide variety of features including picnic tables, beaches, restrooms, fishing, softball, basketball hoops, ponds, tennis, and volleyball.
While there are no ski slopes within Carson City, the city is near the Heavenly Mountain Resort, Diamond Peak and Mount Rose Ski Tahoe skiing areas.

Notable people
Carson City has served as one of the state's centers for politics and business. Every state governor since Denver S. Dickerson has resided in the Governor's Mansion in Carson City. The following personalities took up residence in Carson City at some point in their lives.
 Duane Leroy Bliss, timber businessman
 Orion Clemens, Secretary of Nevada Territory
 Steven S. Coughlin, American epidemiologist and author
 John Cradlebaugh, first Delegate to the U.S. House of Representatives from Nevada Territory
 Abraham Curry, founding father of Carson City and early politician
 Dat So La Lee, Native American basket weaver and artist
 Nellie Verrill Mighels Davis, journalist
 David Eddings, best selling author of fantasy novels
 George Washington Gale Ferris Jr., inventor of the Ferris wheel
 Ellen Hopkins, author
 Paul Laxalt, former Governor and U.S. Senator
 Greg LeMond, two time World Champion road racing cyclist, and three-time winner of the Tour de France 
 Alice Little, Irish-American sex-worker and advocate 
 David Lundquist, Major League baseball player (Chicago White Sox)
 Maurice E. McLoughlin, two-time U.S. Open champion, member of International Tennis Hall of Fame
 Henry Rust Mighels, journalist, politician, first husband of Nellie Verrill Mighels Davis
 Hank Monk, stagecoach driver
 William Ormsby, soldier and namesake of Ormsby County and Ormsby House
 Donovan Osborne, Major League baseball player (St. Louis Cardinals)
 Darrell Rasner, Major League baseball player (New York Yankees)
 Don Tatro, member of the Nevada Senate
 Mark Twain, author (lived with his brother Orion)
 Matt Williams, Major League third baseman (San Francisco Giants, Cleveland Indians, and Arizona Diamondbacks)
 Sarah Winnemucca, Native American activist and author

Economy and infrastructure
The following is a list of notable employers in Carson City from the fourth quarter of 2012:

1,000–1,499 employees
 Carson City School District
500–999 employees
 Nevada Department of Transportation
 Western Nevada College
200–499 employees
 Nevada Department of Corrections
 Nevada Department of Motor Vehicles
 Casino Fandango
 Walmart
 Precision Castparts Corp.
 Gold Dust West Hotel and Casino
 Carson Nugget
 Costco Wholesale Corporation
 Nevada Department of Conservation and Natural Resources
100–199 employees
 Nevada Department of Health and Human Services, Division of Welfare and Supportive Services

Transportation

There are four highways in the city: Nevada State Route 28, U.S. Route 395, U.S. Route 50, and Interstate 580, its only freeway. Phase 1 of the Carson City Freeway Project from US 395, just north of the city, to US 50 was completed in February 2006, and Phase 2A, extending from Rt. 50 to Fairview Drive, was officially opened on September 24, 2009. Phase 2B, Fairview Drive to Rt. 50, was completed in August 2017. Prior to 2012, Carson City was one of only five state capitals not directly served by an interstate highway; the city lost this distinction when I-580 was extended into the city limits.

Carson City's first modern bus system, Jump Around Carson, or JAC, opened to the public in October 2005. JAC uses a smaller urban bus ideal for Carson City. Tahoe Transportation District connects Gardnerville with Carson City.

However, there is virtually no ground public transportation to other destinations. Passenger trains haven't served Carson City since 1950, when the Virginia and Truckee Railroad was shut down. Greyhound Lines stopped their bus services to the town in 2006 and Amtrak discontinued their connecting thruway bus to Sacramento, California in 2008. There is now only a limited Monday – Friday RTC bus service, to Reno which is still served by both Greyhound and Amtrak, as well as Eastern Sierra Transit Authority service from Lone Pine to Reno.

Carson City is also served by the Carson Airport, which is a regional airport in the northern part of the city.

Education
The Carson City School District, the sole public school district of the city, operates ten schools there. The six elementary schools are Bordewich-Bray Elementary School, Empire Elementary School, Fremont Elementary School, Fritsch Elementary School, Mark Twain Elementary School, and Al Seeliger Elementary School. The two middle schools are Carson Middle School and Eagle Valley Middle School. Carson High School and the alternative Pioneer High School serve high school students. Carson High is on Saliman Road.

The district sponsors Carson Montessori School, a public charter school serving grades K-6. Students residing in any Nevada county may enroll. Carson Montessori School is the only school in district operating with a balanced budget. In 2019 Carson Montessori School received the Governor's STEM Schools Designation, an official recognition given to 25 schools statewide which causes a short ceremony attended by the governor during which receiving schools are assigned a 10-foot banner.

Western Nevada College (WNC) is a regionally accredited, two-year and four-year institution which is part of the Nevada System of Higher Education. The college offers many programs including education, arts and science.

Carson City has a public library, the Carson City Library.

Historic buildings

See also

 Carson Hot Springs

References

External links

 
 
 
 Carson City Convention and Visitors Bureau
 

 
Cities in Nevada
Independent cities in the United States
Populated places established in 1858
Nevada counties
1858 establishments in Utah Territory
Former county seats in Nevada